Pies and Guys is a 1958 short subject directed by Jules White starring American slapstick comedy team The Three Stooges (Moe Howard, Larry Fine and Joe Besser). It is the 185th entry in the series released by Columbia Pictures starring the comedians, who released 190 shorts for the studio between 1934 and 1959.

Plot
In the third Stooge adaptation of the 1913 play Pygmalion by George Bernard Shaw, the trio are repairmen who make a scene in the presence of two psychologists, Professors Quackenbush (Milton Frome) and Sedletz (Gene Roth). Quackenbush makes a bet with Sedletz that he can turn the boys into gentlemen through environment. Training is slow and painful for the professor, who pulls his hair out in disgust. However, the Stooges do have the opportunity to flirt with the professor's assistant (Greta Thyssen), while learning proper table etiquette. Finally, the Stooges will decide the wager by their behavior at a fancy society party.

Naturally, the party goes awry. Joe greets the Countess Spritzwasser (Harriette Tarler) by kissing her hand, and biting off the diamond in her ring. Realizing this, Moe and Larry take Joe to a secluded area to lecture him, only to find he has swiped a load of silverware.

Joe then grabs a pie from a pastry table, and tries to eat it whole. Moe sees this, swipes the pie, and pushes Joe out of the way. Seeing another guest, Mrs. Smythe-Smythe (Symona Boniface), approaching, Moe tosses the pie straight up—to which it attaches itself to the ceiling. Seeing that he can barely get a sentence out, she sympathetically comments, "young man, you act as if you have the Sword of Damocles hanging over your head." Moe replies that Mrs. Smythe-Smythe is a psychic and flees, to which the pie comes crashing down on the society matron. This sparks off a massive pie melee that takes no prisoners.

Production notes
Pies and Guys is a scene-for-scene remake of 1947's Half-Wits Holiday, using recurring stock footage from the original. Half-Wits Holiday in itself was a reworking of 1935's Hoi Polloi. New footage was shot in two days on May 6–7, 1957.

References

External links
 
 
 Pies and Guys at threestooges.net

1958 films
1958 comedy films
American black-and-white films
Films based on works by George Bernard Shaw
Films directed by Jules White
The Three Stooges films
The Three Stooges film remakes
Columbia Pictures short films
1950s English-language films
1950s American films